Eretis lugens, commonly known as the savanna elf, is a species of  butterfly in the family Hesperiidae. It is found in Senegal, northern Guinea, northern Sierra Leone, Liberia, northern Ivory Coast, Ghana, Togo, Benin, Nigeria, Cameroon, the Central African Republic, Angola, the Democratic Republic of the Congo, southern Sudan, Ethiopia, Uganda, Burundi, Kenya, Tanzania and north-western Zambia. The habitat consists of Sudan savanna, open Guinea savanna, forest margins, forests and dense woodland.

The larvae feed on Asystasia schimperi, Asystasia coromandeliana, Justicia lukepiensis, Dyschoriste perrotetetti and Barleria species.

References

Butterflies described in 1891
Celaenorrhinini
Butterflies of Africa